South Nyack was a railroad station on the Erie Railroad Northern Branch in South Nyack, New York. The station opened on May 21, 1870, and closed on December 14, 1965, when the Erie-Lackawanna Railroad, successor to the Erie, ended all service north of Sparkill. It was razed in 1970.

References 

Former Erie Railroad stations
Railway stations in Rockland County, New York
Former railway stations in New York (state)
Railway stations closed in 1965
1965 disestablishments in New York (state)